

The Jurca MJ-12 Pee-40 is a sport aircraft designed in France as a 3/4-scale replica of the Curtiss P-40 and marketed for homebuilding. It is one of many wooden homebuilt designs from Romanian born designer Marcel Jurca. Jurca was a Henschel Hs 129 pilot in World War II who started designing aircraft after building a Jodel The builder may also choose to build the fuselage structure from welded steel tube.

Specifications (typical)

References

 
 
 pilotfriend.com

1980s French sport aircraft
Homebuilt aircraft
Replica aircraft
Jurca aircraft
Low-wing aircraft
Single-engined tractor aircraft